Tes Nez Iah is a populated place situated in the far north of Apache County, Arizona, United States, just south of the Utah border. It is along the banks of the Chinle Creek, approximately four miles west of Mexican Water. The name is derived from the Navajo t'iis nééz íí'á, meaning "tall cottonwood trees".

References

Populated places in Apache County, Arizona